Marjana Naceva (born 16 January 1994) is a Macedonian football striker currently playing for Borussia Dortmund in the German Championship. She previously played for Kamenica Sasa, taking part in the Champions League. She has been a member of the North Macedonian national football team since 2011.

References

1994 births
Living people
Macedonian women's footballers
North Macedonia women's international footballers
Women's association football midfielders
ŽFK Kamenica Sasa players